The As d'Or (Golden Ace) is a games award given out by a jury at the Festival International des Jeux in Cannes, France.

The awards were established in 1988 "to highlight the best games offered at the Festival and help festival-goers and the public in their gaming choices". From 1989 to 2003, a jury of journalists allotted "Golden Aces" by category to games presented by their editors.  A special prize, the Super As d'Or, was allotted to the best game from any category.

In 2003, the process was modified to give more autonomy to the jury.  A single As d'Or was awarded, and 10 nominees were announced.

In 2005, the award merged with the Jeu de l'Année. It was decided that the combined award should be named after the year of awarding rather than year of publication, so the first combined award was the 2005 As d'Or Jeu de l'Année with awards in three categories: public/family games, experts, and children. In 2012, the As d'Or Prix du Jury was added. The 2020 edition took place Thursday, February 20 and the nominees were presented at the end of January.

Super As d'Or

As d'Or

L'As d'Or Jeu de l'Année 
L'As d'Or Jeu de l'Année combined in 2005 the L'As d'Or and the Jeu de l'Année into a single set of awards, presented in four categories.

As d'Or Jeu de l'Année (Grand Public)

As d'Or Grand Prix (Expert)

As d'Or Jeu de l'Année Enfant (Children's Games)

As d'Or Prix du Jury

References

External links

  - pdf of awards available from the As d'Or Award page

Game awards
French awards
Awards established in 1988
Board game awards